Daba Township is a township under the administration of Zhaojue County, Sichuan, China. , it has five villages under its administration:
Keqie Village
Wabuguli Village
Tuodu Village
Luowu Village
Teluo Village

See also 
 List of township-level divisions of Sichuan

References 

Township-level divisions of Sichuan
Zhaojue County